Meg Stuart (born 1965 in New Orleans) is an American choreographer and dancer who lives and works in Brussels and Berlin. Her company, Damaged Goods, operates from Brussels since 1994.

Start as a dancer and choreographer

Stuart moved to New York City in 1983 where she studied at New York University. She continued her studies at Movement Research (New York) where she studied several release techniques and was active in the Downtown New York dance scene. In the eighties she worked as a dancer for Nina Martin, Lisa Kraus, Federico Restrepo and Marcus Stern. For five years (1986–1992) she was part of the Randy Warshaw Dance Company. On the invitation of the Klapstuk festival in Leuven (BE) in 1991 she created "Disfigure Study", her first evening-length performance, which launched her career in Europe. In "Disfigure Study", Meg Stuart approaches the body as a vulnerable physical entity, one that can be deformed, deconstructed, and displaced but still resonates with meaning.

Damaged Goods

Interested in devising her own structure, Stuart founded Damaged Goods in Brussels in 1994. Damaged Goods is an open and flexible structure, which makes the production of highly diverse projects and interdisciplinary collaborations possible. Together they have worked on a broad range of projects, ranging from solos such as "XXX for Arlene and Colleagues" (1995), "Soft Wear" (2000) and the evening-length solo "Hunter" (2014) to large-scale choreographies such as "Visitors Only" (2003), "Built to Last" (2012) and "UNTIL OUR HEARTS STOP" (2015). Other projects include video works, installations and site-specific creations. Her work has travelled the international theatre circuit and has also been presented at Documenta X in Kassel (1997), at Manifesta7 in Bolzano (2008) and at PERFORMA09 in New York.

Before they also worked together with Schauspielhaus Zürich (2000–2004), Volksbühne am Rosa-Luxemburg-Platz Berlin (2005–2010), Münchner Kammerspiele (2010–2015) and Ruhrtriennale (2015–2017)

Improvisation and artistic collaboration

Improvisation is an important part of Meg Stuart's practice. She initiated several improvisation projects, such as "Crash Landing" and "Auf den Tisch!". In 2016 Stuart hosted City Lights – a continuous gathering in the Berlin HAU Hebbel am Ufer, in collaboration with an all female group of local artists.

Stuart strives to develop a new language for every piece in collaboration with artists from different creative disciplines and navigates the tension between dance and theatre. Previous collaborations include works developed with visual artists Gary Hill and Ann Hamilton, and composers such as Hahn Rowe and Brendan Dougherty. Through improvisation, Stuart explores physical and emotional states or the memories of them. Her artistic work is analogous to a constantly shifting identity. It constantly redefines itself while searching for new presentation contexts and territories for dance.

Teaching

Alongside her work as a choreographer, Stuart regularly teaches workshops and master classes at dance schools, festivals and institutions. In the book Are we here yet? (2nd edition, 2013), she reflects on her practice in conversation with editor Jeroen Peeters and describes the exercises, tasks and narratives that she uses in workshops and the creative process.

Awards

Meg Stuart and Damaged Goods received the K.U.Leuven Culture Price (2000), the German Theatre prize Der Faust (2006) for her choreography of "Replacement", the prestigious French Prize for Criticism (2008) for "BLESSED", a New York Dance and Performance Award (2008), also known as BESSIE Award for her oeuvre, the Flemish Culture Prize (2008) and the Konrad Wolf Preiz 2012.

In 2014 Meg Stuart received the Grand Prix de la Danse de Montréal, a prize that is awarded since 2011 to dance artists that contributed greatly to the art of dance. That same year the German magazine Tanz – Zeitschrift für Ballett, Tanz und Performance crowned her choreographer of the year for her productions "Sketches/Notebook" and "Hunter".

In 2018, The Venice Biennale awarded Meg Stuart the Golden Lion for Lifetime Achievement in the category of dance. She receives the prize for her constant developing of new languages and methods for each new creation, in which she keeps on redefining new contexts and territories for dance. Meg Stuart/Damaged Goods also received the Deutscher Tanzpreis Award for outstanding performer from Dachverband Tanz Deutschland that year.

Choreographies/collaborations

Disfigure Study, 1991
No Longer Readymade, 1993
Swallow my yellow smile, 1994
XXX for Arlene and Colleagues, 1995
No One is Watching, 1995
Inside Skin #1 They live in Our Breath, 1996
Splayed Mind Out, 1997
Remote, 1997
appetite, 1999
Comeback, 1999
Snapshots, 1999
I'm all yours, 2000
Private Room, 2000
sand table, 2000
Soft Wear, 2000
Highway 101, 2000/2001
Alibi, 2001
Henry IV, 2002
Das goldene Zeitalter, 2003
Visitors Only, 2003
Forgeries, Love and Other Matters, 2004
Der Marterphahl, 2005
REPLACEMENT, 2006
It's not funny!, 2006
Blessed, 2007
Maybe Forever, 2007
All Together Now, 2008
Die Massnahme/Mauser, 2008
Do Animals Cry, 2009
the fault lines, 2010
Signs of Affection, 2010
Off Course, 2010
 Atelier, 2011
VIOLET, 2011
Built to Last, 2012
Sketches/Notebook, 2013
An evening of solo works, 2013
Hunter, 2014
UNTIL OUR HEARTS STOP, 2015
Inflamável, 2016
Shown and Told, 2016
Atelier III, 2017
Projecting [Space[, 2017
Celestial Sorrow, 2018

Improvisations

Crash Landing, 1996–1999
Auf den Tisch!,2005–2011
Politics of Ecstasy, 2009
Atelier II, 2012
City Lights – a continuous gathering, 2016

Projects

Running, 1992
This is the Show and the Show is Many Things, 1994
Revisited, 2007
walk+talk #2, 2008
Intimate Strangers, Brussels, 2008
walk+talk #16, 2011
Intimate Strangers, Ghent, 2011

Video works

 Smell the flowers while you can (Johan Grimonprez, 1994–2012, 6 min)
 Meg Stuart’s Alibi (Maarten Vanden Abeele, 2001, 24 min)
 the invited (Jonathan Inksetter, 2003, 12 min)
 Somewhere in between (Pierre Coulibeuf, 2004, 67 min)
 The Only Possible City (Meg Stuart, 2008)
 I thought I'd never say this (Philipp Hochleichter, 2008, video-installatie)
 Inflamável (Meg Stuart, 2016, 16 min)
 Study of a Portrait (Meg Stuart, 2016, video-installatie)

Collaborations
Various projects by Meg Stuart were created in collaboration with dancers and performers, amongst others:

 Florence Augendre;
 Simone Aughterlony;
 Heine Avdal;
 Alexander Baczynski-Jenkins;
 Milli Bitterli;
 Francisco Camacho;
 Varinia Canto Vila;
 Thomas Conway;
 Ugo Dehaes;
 Jorge Rodolfo de Hoyos;
 Mor Demer;
 Christine De Smedt;
 Joséphine Evrard;
 Davis Freeman;
 Eric Grondin;
 David Hernandez;
 Abraham Hurtado;
 Márcio Kerber Canabarro;
 Adam Linder;
 Antonija Livingstone;
 Benoît Lachambre;
 Anna MacRae;
 Roberto Martínez;
 Renan Martins de Oliveira;
 Andreas Müller;
 Anja Müller;
 Kotomi Nishiwaki;
 Rachid Ouramdane;
 Sonja Pregrad;
 Vania Rovisco;
 Roger Sala Reyner;
 Maria F. Scaroni;
 Yukiko Shinozaki;
 Mariana Tengner;
 Kristof Van Boven;
 Frank James Willens;
 Thomas Wodianka;
 Sigal Zouk.

Other artists that operated as co-creator were a.o.

 Gary Hill (Splayed Mind Out);
 Ann Hamilton (Appetite);
 Magali Desbazeille (Sand Table)
 Jorge Léon (I’m all yours);
 Philipp Gehmacher (Maybe Forever);
 Tim Etchells (Shown and told).

Dramaturges that often collaborated on projects by Meg Stuart are a.o.:
 André Lepecki; 
 Bettina Masuch;
 Jeroen Peeters; 
 Bart Van den Eynde;
 Myriam Van Imschoot.

For music and sound design, Meg Stuart often collaborates with:
 Bart Aga; 
 Brendan Dougherty;
 Paul Lemp; 
 Vincent Malstaf;
 Hahn Rowe.

Textual contributions for various productions were produced by Tim Etchells. 
Video, film and other visuals were created by amongst others
 
 Chris Kondek;
 Jorge León;
 Vladimir Miller.

Costumes were created by a.o.:
 
 Nathalie Douxfils;
 Sofie Durnez;
 Nadine Grellinger;
 Nina Gundlach;
 Claudia Hill;
 Tina Kloempken;
 Jean-Paul Lespagnard;
 Dorothee Loermann.

Light design was created by Amongst others:

 Sandra Blatterer;
 Marc Dewit;
 Åsa Frankenberg;
 Michael Hulls;
 Jan Maertens.

Set designs were created by a.o.:

 Janina Audick;
 Doris Dziersk;
 Anna Viebrock;
 Jozef Wouters.

References

Further reading

A Journey in Identity, From the Clinical to the Feral
Extended discussion about her work with Catherine Sullivan

External links

goethe.de

American women choreographers
American choreographers
American female dancers
American dancers
Living people
1965 births
Members of the Academy of Arts, Berlin